OK Human is the fourteenth studio album by American rock band Weezer, released on January 29, 2021 by Crush Music and Atlantic Records. Featuring a baroque-pop influenced sound, inspired by albums such as Harry Nilsson's Nilsson Sings Newman (1970) and the Beach Boys' Pet Sounds (1966), the album was recorded entirely with analogue equipment and features a 38-piece orchestra. The album was preceded by the lead single "All My Favorite Songs", released on January 21, 2021. The album received generally positive reviews from critics. OK Human is the first of two Weezer albums to be released in 2021, followed nearly four months later by Van Weezer.

Background 
Work on OK Human began as early as 2017, when the band decided to make an album that combined rock instrumentation with an orchestra. Producer Jake Sinclair suggested that they hire a 38-piece orchestra and also gave Weezer frontman Rivers Cuomo the album Nilsson Sings Newman to listen to, on which singer Harry Nilsson covered songs by Randy Newman. They had just finished production on the album when they got an offer to join bands Green Day and Fall Out Boy on the Hella Mega Tour for the summer of 2020. This prompted them to start work on another album, Van Weezer, which featured music that would translate better to a stadium tour, but when the COVID-19 pandemic delayed the tour, they decided to switch around the release dates of the albums once again.

Cuomo first mentioned OK Human prior to the release of Weezer (The Black Album) in a February 2019 interview with the Los Angeles Times. He noted the album was "piano-based" and "very eccentric" and that he had recorded strings for the album at Abbey Road Studios. In May 2020, Cuomo commented during a Zoom call that he estimated OK Human was "75% done", but that he did not anticipate the album being released in 2020. The album was planned to be released following their intended fourteenth album, Van Weezer, but when the album suffered a year-long delay following the COVID-19 pandemic, the band hinted that they were shifting their focus to completing OK Human first. On November 17, 2020, the band announced the completion of OK Human during a Q&A session following a livestream performance. On January 18, 2021, the band announced a release date of January 29 with the release date of the lead single, "All My Favorite Songs" on January 21.

The album's title is a play on the 1997 Radiohead album OK Computer. The cover art was created by Mattias Adolfsson.

Composition
Musically, OK Human has been described as orchestral pop, chamber pop, baroque pop, pop, and pop rock.

Critical reception

OK Human received generally favorable reviews. At Metacritic, which assigns a normalized rating out of 100 to reviews from professional publications, the release received an average score of 75, based on 21 reviews, indicating "generally favorable reviews". Aggregator AnyDecentMusic? gave the album a 7.3 out of 10, based on their assessment of the critical consensus.

Writing for AllMusic, Stephen Thomas Erlewine wrote a highly positive review of the album, stating that the album "offers a singular, complete listening experience unlike anything else in their catalog." Similarly, R.A. Hagan, writing for Clash Music, praised the album for being "more careful, sincere, and delicately crafted" than the band's previous two studio albums, Pacific Daydream and the Black Album. Aaron Mook of Chorus.fm recommended the album, calling it "a left-field masterpiece that comes dangerously close to reaching the heights of the band's early career."

However, publications like Entertainment Weekly and Pitchfork were more critical of the album. Writing for Pitchfork, Ian Cohen wrote that the album felt "as impersonal as water-cooler small talk". Eli Enis wrote for Entertainment Weekly that "the fleeting moments of authenticity are hidden beneath a pile of hokey one-liners, spotty vocal performances, and awkward arrangements that rely on the accompanying orchestra to provide all of the emotional depth", but still noted that "it's arguably the darkest and most personal record that Cuomo has written since his fans' beloved Pinkerton."

Other music critics were more ambivalent in their judgement of the album. Writing for Consequence of Sound, Tyler Clark concluded; "Chalk it up to the unpredictability of 2021; despite the creative and cultural headwinds into which it was released, OK Human lands as a surprisingly charming collection of pop tunes whose imperfections add to rather than detract from the experience." In the review for The Line of Best Fit, Alex Wisgard stated that "Weezer’s greatest misses may come from their frontman’s visceral desperation to stay relevant, but it’s a relief to hear them take chances and risk failure in such a new way. The album might just be OK, but it’s been a long time since Weezer have dared to be this human."

Track listing

Personnel
Adapted from AllMusic.

Weezer
Rivers Cuomo – lead vocals, piano, composer
Brian Bell – piano, acoustic guitar, organ, backing vocals
Scott Shriner – bass, backing vocals<ref name="COSBrianInterview"
Patrick Wilson – drums, backing vocals

Production
Jonathan Allen – engineer
Lawton Burris – assistant engineer
William Carroll – engineer
Zach Fisher – engineer
Brian Fombona – engineer
Pete Lyman – mastering
Perry Margouleff – engineer
Andy Maxwell – assistant engineer
Branko Presley – assistant engineer
Paul Pritchard – engineer
Suzy Shinn – engineer, vocal producer
Maureen Sickler – engineer
Jake Sinclair – producer
John Sinclair – mixing
Rachel White – engineer
Karl Wingate – assistant engineer
William Wittman – engineer
Lazaro Zarate – assistant engineer

Additional musicians
Tara Helen O'Connor – flute, piccolo
Keisuke Ikuma – English horn, oboe
Pavel Vinnitsky – clarinet, bass clarinet
Dan Shelly – bassoon
Erik Ralske – French horn
Anne Sharer – French horn
Tony Kadleck – trumpet
Ray Riccomini – trumpet
Ryan Keberle – trombone
Sasha Romero – trombone
Lisa Kim – concert master, violin
Peter Bahng – violin
Ann Lehmann – violin
Matt Lehmann – violin
Joanna Maurer – violin
Sharon Yamada – violin
Jung Sun Yoo – violin
Will Frampton – viola
Joel Noyes – viola
Michael Roth – viola
Becky Young – viola
Alan Stepansky – cello
Rob Mathes – arranger, horn conductor, string conductor, woodwind arrangement

Charts

References

2021 albums
Weezer albums
Atlantic Records albums
Crush Management albums
Albums produced by Jake Sinclair (musician)
Orchestral pop albums
Chamber pop albums
Baroque pop albums